Willson Eduardo Contreras (born May 13, 1992) is a Venezuelan professional baseball catcher for the St. Louis Cardinals of Major League Baseball (MLB). He has previously played in MLB for the Chicago Cubs.

Contreras made his MLB debut in 2016 and was a member of the 2016 World Series champions. Contreras was voted as a starter in the MLB All-Star Game in 2018, 2019, and 2022. He signed with the Cardinals as a free agent after the 2022 season.

Early life 
Contreras was born on May 13, 1992, in Puerto Cabello, Venezuela, to Olga and William Contreras. He was the middle child of three, with an older brother, Willmer, and a younger brother, William. Willson and William would play baseball in the street as children by using a crumpled piece of paper as a ball. At the age of 16, Contreras began attending a baseball academy in Venezuela run by the Chicago Cubs of Major League Baseball (MLB).

Career

Minors
Contreras signed with the Chicago Cubs as an international free agent in 2009. He made his professional debut with the Dominican Summer League Cubs that year. He batted .205 in 29 games at age 17. In 2010, he batted .313 in 17 games at age 18 with them. In 2011 and 2012 he played with the Boise Hawks. Contreras spent 2013 with the Kane County Cougars, 2014 with the Daytona Cubs, and 2015 with the Tennessee Smokies. He was named the Cubs Minor League Player of the Year in 2015 after batting .333/.413/.478 with eight home runs. During his minor league career, he played the positions of catcher, first base, second base, third base, left field, and right field. The Cubs added him to their 40-man roster after the season.

Contreras was rated 57th on Baseball Prospectus' top 101 prospect list prior to the 2016 season.

Chicago Cubs (2016–2022)

2016–2017
The Cubs promoted Contreras to the major league team on June 17, 2016. On June 19, he hit a two-run home run on the first pitch of his first major-league at-bat after two pick-off attempts by the pitcher to first base, becoming the 30th player in the modern MLB era to do so. In his fifth game, he started at the first base position, and started in left field in his eighth game, establishing himself as a versatile player on the field. Contreras finished the 2016 regular season with 80 hits in 295 at-bats with 12 home runs, 35 RBIs and a .275 batting average.

In Game 4 of the 2016 National League Division Series against the San Francisco Giants with the Cubs having a 2–1 series lead, Contreras had a pinch-hit two-run single in the top of the ninth inning, tying the score at five. Contreras was forced at second by a Jason Heyward bunt but the Cubs scored the go-ahead run later that inning, sending them to the National League Championship Series. The Cubs won the 2016 World Series over the Cleveland Indians, giving the Cubs their first championship in 108 years. Contreras drove in a run with a double in the seventh game.

On April 2, 2017, Contreras was the Cubs' opening day starting catcher against the St. Louis Cardinals. After hitting five home runs in six games, he was selected as the National League's Player of the Week on August 8. On August 9, Contreras suffered a moderate hamstring strain while running to first base against the San Francisco Giants. At the time of the injury he was batting .274 with 93 hits in 339 at bats, hit 21 home runs and had 70 RBIs. Willson returned from the injury on September 10 as a pinch hitter. On September 15, 2017, Contreras was ejected and suspended one game for throwing his mask, which bounced and hit umpire Jordan Baker in the shins.
In 377 at-bats, Contreras finished the season with a .276 batting average, 104 hits, 21 home runs, five stolen bases and 74 RBIs.

2018–2022

Batting .287 with seven home runs and 34 RBIs, Contreras was voted to start in the 2018 All-Star Game, his first All-Star appearance. He finished his 2018 campaign batting .249 with ten home runs and 54 RBIs in 138 games.

Contreras had a fast start to the 2019 season, batting .315 with an on-base plus slugging percentage of 1.069 into mid-May. On May 11, he had his first career walk-off hit, a solo shot off the Milwaukee Brewers' Burch Smith, ending a 15-inning marathon. Contreras and teammate Javier Baez were named starters for the National League in the 2019 All-Star game, but neither registered a hit. On August 3, Contreras strained his hamstring running to first base and was put on the 10-day injured list. He finished the 2019 season slashing .272/.355/.533 with 24 home runs and 64 RBIs over 105 games.

In the shortened 60-game season in 2020, Contreras played in 57 games with a batting line of .243/.356/.407 to go along with seven home runs and 26 RBI.

In 2021, Contreras slashed .237/.340/.438 with 21 home runs and 57 RBIs in 128 games. He also caught the first combined no-hitter in Cubs history against the Los Angeles Dodgers on June 24.

On May 16, 2022, Contreras hit a grand slam off of Pittsburgh Pirates starter Bryse Wilson, with the blast marking his 100th career home run. In 2022, Contreras put up a slash of .243/.349/.466 alongside 55 RBIs and 22 home runs. He was selected to participate in the 2022 MLB All Star Game alongside his brother, William Contreras, becoming just the fifth pair of brothers to play in the same All Star Game in baseball history.

St. Louis Cardinals (2023–present)

On December 9, 2022, Contreras signed a five-year, $87.5 million contract with the St. Louis Cardinals.

Personal life
Contreras's younger brother, William Contreras, is also a catcher in MLB. Contreras married Andrea Villamizar on May 3, 2018. Contreras is a supporter of the Venezuelan opposition and Juan Guaidó.

See also
List of Major League Baseball players with a home run in their first major league at bat
List of Major League Baseball players from Venezuela

References

External links

 

1992 births
Living people
Boise Hawks players
Chicago Cubs players
Daytona Cubs players
Dominican Summer League Cubs players
Venezuelan expatriate baseball players in the Dominican Republic
Iowa Cubs players
Kane County Cougars players
Major League Baseball catchers
Major League Baseball left fielders
Major League Baseball players from Venezuela
Mesa Solar Sox players
National League All-Stars
Tennessee Smokies players
Tigres de Aragua players
Venezuelan expatriate baseball players in the United States
People from Puerto Cabello